Noah Plume (born 18 August 1996) is a German footballer who plays as a defensive midfielder for VfB Lübeck.

References

External links
 
 

1996 births
Living people
German footballers
Association football central defenders
Association football midfielders
TSV Havelse players
Sportfreunde Lotte players
VfB Lübeck players
3. Liga players
Regionalliga players